Dinard–Pleurtuit–Saint-Malo Airport or Aéroport de Dinard – Pleurtuit – Saint-Malo  is an airport serving the city of Saint-Malo, France.

In 2017, Dinard-Pleurtuit-Saint-Malo airport handled 121.697 passengers, an increase of 10.2% over 2016.

Airlines and destinations
The following airlines operate regular scheduled and charter flights at Dinard–Pleurtuit–Saint-Malo Airport:

Statistics

Côte d'Emeraude Flying Club 
The flying club is located on the northeast of the 12/30 runway. It currently has four planes: a Robin DR400-180cv NM, a DR400-160cv HK, a DR221-100cv ZO and a Tecnam P2002JF CE. It is possible to get a PPL licence and an EASA LAPL (A) licence.

Access 
The airport is located from a short distance from the major touristic cities (by car) :

15 minutes from Dinard city center.
20 minutes from Dinan.
25 minutes from Saint-Malo.
55 minutes from Rennes via the N137 dual carriageway.

Taxis and car rental are available from inside of the terminal.

References

External links 
Dinard Aéroport Bretagne (official site) 
Dinard Brittany Airport (official site) 
Aéroport de Aéroport de Dinard – Pleurtuit – Saint-Malo (Union des Aéroports Français) 

Airports in Brittany
Buildings and structures in Ille-et-Vilaine
Saint-Malo